Walter Abel (June 6, 1898 – March 26, 1987) was an American film, stage and radio actor.

Life
Abel was born in St. Paul, Minnesota, the son of Christine (née Becker) and Richard Michael Abel.  Abel graduated from the American Academy of Dramatic Arts where he had studied in 1917 and joined a touring company. His brother Alfred died in 1922 from tuberculosis contracted while serving overseas in World War I. Abel was married to concert harpist Marietta Bitter.

Career

Abel made his film debut in 1918 with a small part in Out of a Clear Sky.

He made his Broadway debut in Forbidden in 1919. In 1924 he appeared in two Eugene O'Neill plays simultaneously: Bound East for Cardiff at the Provincetown Playhouse and Desire Under the Elms at the Greenwich Village Theater. His many theatre credits include As You Like It (1923), William Congreve's Love for Love (1925), Anton Chekhov's The Seagull (1929-1930), Mourning Becomes Electra (1929), Kaufman and Hart's Merrily We Roll Along (1934), and Trelawny of the 'Wells' (1975). He also appeared in Channing Pollock's play The Enemy (1926) with Fay Bainter. The play was adapted to film as The Enemy (1927) with Lillian Gish and Ralph Forbes. He made his stage debut in London in the 1929 Coquette.

His first major film role was as D'Artagnan in RKO Pictures' 1935 The Three Musketeers. Abel went on to play in more than sixty films. Abel was a vice president of the Screen Actors' Guild. Abel played hyperactive agent Danny Reed in the 1942 musical comedy Holiday Inn, in support of Bing Crosby and Fred Astaire.

Abel also appeared as a concert narrator or reader with Eugene Ormandy the Philadelphia Orchestra in Aaron Copland's Lincoln Portrait in 1951, and in Dylan Thomas' Under Milk Wood in 1953.

Death
Abel died March 26, 1987, of a myocardial infarction at a nursing home in Essex, Connecticut. He was cremated and a memorial service was held at the Little Church Around the Corner in Manhattan. His ashes were combined with those of his wife and scattered in Long Island Sound.

Filmography

Film

Television

Radio appearances

References

External links

1898 births
1987 deaths
20th-century American male actors
American male film actors
American male stage actors
American male silent film actors
American male radio actors
Male actors from Saint Paul, Minnesota
American Academy of Dramatic Arts alumni